Farzana Rikta is a Bangladeshi actress, model and television presenter who has acted in television advertisements, films and television series.

Biography
Farzana Rikta is the only daughter of Nazrul Islam and Mahfuza Islam from the Jashore District. She obtained a Bachelor of Science degree in chemistry from Jagannath University.

Rikta's first professional credit was a television advertisement directed by Amitabh Reza. She made her Dhallywood film acting debut in 2015 with Kartooz, the debut film directed by Bapparaj. Her second film Ekattorer Nishan was released in 2016 and her third film Alta Banu was released in 2018.

Rikta has also acted in television and has worked as a television presenter in the productions Star World from Banglavision and FNF Journey from Gazi TV.

Filmography

Selected television dramas
 Don
 Jole Veja Rong
 Bachelor.com
 Dulavai Jindabad
 Talk of the Town
 Chhoto Bou
 Cat House
 Bap Beta 420
 Bidesh Babu
 Lal Card

Selected television advertisements
 Grameenphone Caller Tune
 RFL Chair
 RFL Fitting Pipe
 Pran Green Chilly Sauce
 Grameenphone Confusion
 Surf Excel
 Bangladesh Melamine
 Pran Frooto Juice
 Jui Coconut Oil
 Banglalion WiMax Modem
 Regal Furniture
 Airtel

As television presenter
 Star Word (Banglavision)
 FNF Journey (Gazi TV)

References

External links
 

Bangladeshi film actresses
Bangladeshi television actresses
Living people
Bangladeshi television presenters
Bangladeshi women television presenters
Bangladeshi female models
Jagannath University alumni
People from Jessore District
Year of birth missing (living people)